"21" is a song by American rapper Polo G from his second studio album The Goat (2020). It was produced by Keanu Beats and Khaled Rohaim.

Composition
The song has been described as "808-heavy". It features two verses from Polo G, who sings about his old life in the streets and his new life and fame, as a celebration of his 21st birthday. Additionally, he talks about his drug use, citing the death of his friend Juice Wrld as motivating him to not relapse on drugs.

Music video
The official music video was directed by Cole Bennett and released on June 15, 2020. It opens with a hooded gunman who shoots at Polo G as he wakes up in his room. Polo walks through a drug house, a prison and the hallways of a backlot, while the unseen attacker follows and periodically fires at him. Objects levitate around the Polo, and Juice Wrld also makes a small cameo in the video. The video ends with the shooter removing his hood and revealing to be Polo G himself, who then grows horns resembling that of the Devil beneath his dreadlocks.

Charts

Certifications

References

2020 songs
Polo G songs
Songs written by Polo G
Music videos directed by Cole Bennett